The House of Habsburg-Lorraine originated from the marriage in 1736 of Francis III, Duke of Lorraine and Bar, and Maria Theresa of Austria, later successively Queen of Bohemia,  Queen of Hungary, Queen of Croatia and Archduchess of Austria. Its members are the legitimate surviving line of both the House of Habsburg and the House of Lorraine, inheriting their patrimonial possessions and vocation to the Empire from their female ancestress of the House of Habsburg and from the male line of the House of Lorraine.

The branch of Vaudemont and Guise from the House of Lorraine become the major branch after a brief interlude in 1453–1473, when the duchy passed in right of Charles de Bourbon's daughter to her husband John of Calabria, a Capetian, Lorraine reverted to the House of Vaudemont, a junior branch of the House of Lorraine, in the person of René II, who later added to his titles that of Duke of Bar.

The House of Habsburg takes its name from Habsburg Castle, a fortress built in the 1020s by Count Radbot of Klettgau in Aargau, present-day Switzerland. His grandson, Otto II, was the first to take on the name of the fortress as his own, adding Graf von Habsburg ("Count of Habsburg") to his title. The House of Habsburg gathered dynastic momentum during the 11th, 12th, and 13th centuries, and in 1273, Radbot's seventh-generation descendant Rudolph of Habsburg became Roman-German King. He moved the family's power base to the Duchy of Austria, which the Habsburgs ruled until 1918.

The current house orders are the Order of the Golden Fleece and the Imperial and Royal Order of Saint George. The House of Habsburg-Lorraine still exists today and the current head of the family is Karl von Habsburg.

History of the dynasty

The first member of the House of Habsburg-Lorraine to rule over the Holy Roman Empire was Joseph II, a sovereign raised during the Enlightenment. By the new ideals he brought, he implemented many reforms, most of which were to the detriment of the clergy. Upon his death in 1790, he was succeeded by his brother Leopold II, who in 1791 invited Europe's powers to help the French royal family to stifle the ideals of the revolution without military intervention. He died a few days before France declared war on Austria.

In 1792, Leopold's son, Francis II, was crowned emperor in Frankfurt. After the beheading of the French sovereigns, he, along with the other European sovereigns created the First Coalition against Revolutionary France. The coalition initially recorded some success, but soon began to withdraw, especially in Italy, where the Austrians were repeatedly defeated by the Corsican general Napoleon Bonaparte.

With the Treaty of Campo Formio in 1797, the Milanese were handed over to France, while the Austrians retained Veneto, Istria and Dalmatia. This pact was followed by others that reduced the dominion of the Habsburgs to Austria, Bohemia and Hungary; Francis II was also forced to renounce  the imperial title, but he later proclaimed himself Emperor of Austria, to remedy this loss.

After the defeats at Leipzig (1813) and Waterloo (1815), Napoleon was exiled to the island of Saint Helena, where he died.
 In the same year of Waterloo the Congress of Vienna was established with which the Restoration began. Congress demanded the restoration of the old regimesーAustria recovered all the Italian, Slavic and German territories that they had lost during the Napoleonic Wars, and the Holy Alliance was also established between Austria, Russia and Prussia, which had the task of suppressing all the pro-French or independence revolutionary movements that would have erupted in Europe.

In the years that followed, Francis II pursued a centralization policy, on the advice of Prime Minister Metternich; but precisely because of it, and emerging ideals of independence, the riots of 1848 broke out, which devastated all of Europe. This led to the expulsion of the Prime Minister from the Imperial Chancellery, and the rise of Franz Joseph, replacing Ferdinand I who was forced to abdicate in favour of the 18-year-old man.

End of the rule of the House of Habsburg-Lorraine in Europe 
Franz Joseph I (1830–1916), was the last great personality of the House of Habsburg. Under his reign (1848–1916), Austria seemed to relive its great splendor and Vienna became the largest and most beautiful city in Middle Europe. The emperor, however, waged the Italian War of Independence and the Austro-Prussian war; both ended in defeats, putting an end to Austrian supremacy in Italy and Germany and accelerating the gradual decline of the dynasty.

In 1867 Franz Joseph granted effective autonomy to the Kingdom of Hungary within the Austrian Empire under the terms of the Ausgleich; politically and militarily they were united, but in terms of internal policy and administration they remained separate entities. The title of the Head of State became "Emperor of Austria and King of Hungary", although he was also referred to as "Emperor of Austria-Hungary".

With the growing interest of Austria-Hungary and Russia in the Balkans, strong tensions were created between the Habsburgs and Russia, eventually leading Austria to enter into alliance with Germany and Italy.

In 1914, with the assassination of Archduke Franz Ferdinand in Sarajevo the First World War broke out between the Central Powers of Austria-Hungary, Germany, Bulgaria and the Ottoman Empire and the Entente Powers—the British Empire, France, Russia, among others.

In 1916 Franz Joseph died and was succeeded by his grandnephew Charles I. Charles – the last sovereign – upon losing the war, renounced the exercise of power, but did not abdicate. He was forced into exile on April 3, 1919. The Habsburg dominions were subsequently divided into independent republics.

The House of Habsburg-Lorraine refused to swear its allegiance to the new Republic of Austria, therefore family members were forced into exile and their property was confiscated. The law of exile still applies to the descendants of Emperor Charles under the same conditions. In 1961, Otto von Habsburg, the late head of the House and formerly a member of the European Parliament, relinquished the monarchy and the succession rights of his descendants in exchange for an end to exile. He was known in the Republic of Austria as Dr. Otto Habsburg-Lothringen, since the Republic does not officially recognise titles of nobility.

The House of Habsburg-Lorraine today 
The current leader of the House of Habsburg-Lorraine is Karl von Habsburg, who succeeded his father Otto as head of the royal house after his father renounced the role in 2007. Karl is the eldest grandson of the last emperor of Austria-Hungary, Charles I.

 Leopold II, Holy Roman Emperor (1747–1792)
 Emperor Francis I (1768–1835)
 Emperor Ferdinand I (1793–1875)
 Archduke Franz Karl (1802–1878)
 Emperor Franz Joseph I (1830–1916)
 Crown Prince Rudolf (1858–1889)
 Archduke Karl Ludwig (1833–1896)
 Archduke Franz Ferdinand (1863–1914);  morganatic marriage to Sophie, Duchess of Hohenberg
 Archduke Otto Francis (1865–1906)
 Emperor Charles I (1887–1922)
 Crown Prince Otto (1912–2011)
 Archduke Karl (born 1961)
 (1) Archduke Ferdinand (b. 1997)
 (2) Archduke Georg (b. 1964); married to Duchess Eilika of Oldenburg
 (3) Archduke Karl-Konstantin (b. 2004)
 Archduke Robert of Austria-Este (1915–1996)
(4) Archduke Lorenz of Austria-Este (b. 1955); married to Princess Astrid of Belgium
(5) Archduke Amedeo of Austria-Este (b. 1986); married to Elisabetta Maria Rosboch von Wolkenstein
(6) Archduke Maximilian of Austria-Este (b. 2019)
(7) Archduke Joachim of Austria-Este (b. 1991)
(8) Archduke Gerhard of Austria-Este (b. 1957); married to Iris Jandrasits
(9) Archduke Martin of Austria-Este (b. 1959); married to Princess Katharina von Isenburg
(10) Archduke Bartholomäus of Austria-Este (b. 2006)
(11) Archduke Emmanuel of Austria-Este (b. 2008)
 (12) Archduke Luigi Amedeo of Austria-Este (b. 2011)
 Archduke Felix (1916–2011)
(13) Archduke Carlos Felipe (b. 1954), morganatically (?) married in 1994 to (1) [divorced (and annulled ?) in 1997] Martina Donath, (2) [civilly (and religiously ?)] Annie-Claire Lacrambe, two sons, one by either marriage (the eldest one was born before marriage).
(14) Archduke Louis-Damian (b. 1998)
Archduke Raimund (1958–2008), married to Bettina Götz
(15) Archduke Felix (b. 1996)
(16) Archduke István (b. 1961), married to Paola de Temesváry
(17) Archduke Andreas (b. 1994)
 (18) Archduke Pál (b. 1997)
 Archduke Carl Ludwig (1918–2007)
(19) Archduke Rudolf (b. 1950); married to Baroness Hélène de Villenfagne de Vogelsanck (marriage retroactively approved as dynastic)
(20) Archduke Carl Christian (b. 1977); married to Estelle de Saint-Romain
(21) Father Johannes Habsbourg-Lorraine (b. 1981), a priest of the Eucharistein Community
(22) Archduke Thomas (b. 1986)
(23) Archduke Franz-Ludwig (b. 1988)
(24) Archduke Michael (b. 1990)
 (25) Archduke Josef (b. 1991)
 (26) Archduke Carl Christian (b. 1954); married to Princess Marie Astrid of Luxembourg
(27) Archduke Imre (b. 1985); married to Kathleen Walker
(28) Archduke Christoph (b. 1988), married to Adélaïde Drapé-Frisch
(29) Archduke Josef (b. 2020)
 (30) Archduke Alexander (b. 1990)
 Archduke Rudolf (1919–2010)
(30) Archduke Karl Peter (b. 1955); married to Princess Alexandra von Wrede
(31) Archduke Lorenz (b. 2003)
(32) Archduke Simeon (b. 1958); married to Princess María of Bourbon-Two Sicilies
(33) Archduke Johannes (b. 1997)
(34) Archduke Ludwig (b. 1998)
 (35) Archduke Philipp (b. 2007)
 Archduke Maximilian Eugen (1895–1952)
 Archduke Ferdinand (1918–2004)
 (36) Archduke Maximilian (b. 1961); married to Sara Maya Al-Askari
(37) Archduke Nikolaus (b. 2005)
(38) Archduke Constantin (b. 2007)
 Archduke Heinrich (1925–2014)
(39) Archduke Philipp (b. 1962); married to Mayasuni Heath
(40) Archduke Ferdinand (b. 1965); married to Countess Katharina von Hardenberg
 (41) Archduke Jakob-Maximilian (b. 2002)
 (42) Archduke Konrad (b. 1971); married to Ashmita Goswami.
 Ferdinand III, Grand Duke of Tuscany (1769–1824), founder of the Tuscany branch of the imperial house.
 Leopold II, Grand Duke of Tuscany (1797–1870)
 Ferdinand IV, Grand Duke of Tuscany (1835–1908)
 Archduke Peter Ferdinand (1874–1948)
 Archduke Gottfried (1902–1984)
 Archduke Leopold Franz, Prince of Tuscany (1942-2021)
(43) Archduke Sigismund, Grand Duke of Tuscany (b. 1966); married to Elyssa Edmonstone
(44) Archduke Leopold, Grand Prince of Tuscany (b. 2001)
 (45) Archduke Maximilian, Prince of Tuscany (b. 2004)
(46) Archduke Guntram, Prince of Tuscany (b. 1967); morganatically (in Tuscany) married to Debora de Sola, recognised as Countess von Habsburg [marriage retroactively approved as dynastic (only in Austria)]
(47) Tiziano Leopold, Count von Habsburg (b. 2004), keeps his Austro-Hungarian dynastic rights.
 Archduke Georg, Prince of Tuscany (1905–1952)
(48) Archduke Radbot, Prince of Tuscany (b. 1938); morganatically married to Caroline Proust, with issue.
 (49) Archduke Georg, Prince of Tuscany (b. 1952).
 Archduke Karl Salvator, Prince of Tuscany (1839–1892)
 Archduke Leopold Salvator, Prince of Tuscany (1863–1931)
 Archduke Anton, Prince of Tuscany (1901–1987)
 (50) Archduke Dominik, Prince of Tuscany (b. 1937); morganatically married twice to (1) [divorced] Engel von Voss, 2 sons; (2) Emmanuela (Nella) Mlynarski.
 Archduke Franz Salvator, Prince of Tuscany (1866–1939)
 Archduke Hubert Salvator, Prince of Tuscany (1894–1971)
Archduke Friedrich Salvator, Prince of Tuscany (1927–1999)
(51) Archduke Leopold, Prince of Tuscany (b. 1956)
 (52) Archduke Alexander Salvator, Prince of Tuscany (b. 1959); married to Countess Maria-Gabriele von Waldstein
(53) Archduke Constantin Salvator, Prince of Tuscany (b. 2002)
 (54) Archduke Paul Salvator, Prince of Tuscany (b. 2003)
(55) Archduke Andreas Salvator, Prince of Tuscany (b. 1936); married to (1) [divorced 2001 (and annulled 2002)] Maria de la Piedad Espinosa de los Monteros y Rosillo (2) 2001 (civilly) and 2003 (religiously) Countess Valerie Podstatzky-Lichtenstein. Issue by the second marriage only.
 (56) Archduke Casimir Salvator, Prince of Tuscany (b. 2003)
(57) Archduke Markus, Prince of Tuscany (b. 1946); married morganatically to Hildegard (Hilde) Maria Jungmayr, with issue.
(58) Archduke Johann, Prince of Tuscany (b. 1947); married morganatically to Anne-Marie Stummer, with issue.
 (59) Archduke Michael, Prince of Tuscany (b. 1949); married in 1992 to Eva Antonia von Hofmann, with one daughter.
 Archduke Theodore Salvator, Prince of Tuscany (1899–1978)
(60) Archduke Carl Salvator, Prince of Tuscany (b. 1936); married to Edith Wenzl Frn von Sternbach [marriage retroactively approved as dynastic (only in Austria)] 
(61) Count Matthias of Habsburg (b. 1971), keeps his Austro-Hungarian dynastic rights; married in 1995 to (1) [divorced and annulled] Sabine Binder, (2) 1999 [civilly and religiously] Eva Anderle. Had issue by second marriage.
(62) Count Nikolaus of Habsburg (b. 2000), keeps his Austro-Hungarian dynastic rights. 
(63) Count Jakob of Habsburg (b. 2001), keeps his Austro-Hungarian dynastic rights.
 (64) Count Martin of Habsburg (b. 2011), keeps his Austro-Hungarian dynastic rights.
(65) Count Johannes of Habsburg (b. 1974), keeps his Austro-Hungarian dynastic rights; married to Katharina Lieselotte Riedl Edle von Riedenstein
(66) Count Bernhard of Habsburg (b. 1977), keeps his Austro-Hungarian dynastic rights.
 (67) Count Benedikt of Habsburg (b. 1983), keeps his Austro-Hungarian dynastic rights.
 Archduke Clemens Salvator, Prince of Tuscany (1904–1974); married to Elisabeth Gfn Rességuier de Miremont [marriage retroactively approved as dynastic (only in Austria)]
(68) Clemens, Prince von Altenburg (b. 1932), retroactively integrated into the dynasty; married to Laurence Costa de Beauregard
(69) Philipp, Prince von Altenburg (b. 1966), retroactively integrated into the dynasty.
(70) Georg, Prince von Altenburg (b. 1933), retroactively integrated into the dynasty.
 Peter, Prince von Altenburg (1935–2008), retroactively integrated into the dynasty; married to Juliane Gfn von Waldstein-Forni
 (71) Friedrich, Prince von Altenburg (b. 1966), retroactively integrated into the dynasty; married to Gabriele Gfn von Walterskirchen
(72) Emanuel, Prince von Altenburg (b.2002)
 (73) Nikolaus, Prince von Altenburg (b. 2008)
 (74) Leopold, Prince von Altenburg (b. 1971), retroactively integrated into the dynasty.
(75) Franz Josef, Prince von Altenburg (1941-2021), retroactively integrated into the dynasty; married to Christa Frn von Härdtl
 (76) Johannes, Prince von Altenburg (b. 1949), retroactively integrated into the dynasty.
 Archduke Joseph, Palatine of Hungary (1776–1847)
 Archduke Joseph Karl (1833–1905)
 Archduke Joseph August (1872–1962)
 Archduke Joseph Francis (1895–1957)
Archduke Joseph Árpád (1933–2017)
(77) Archduke Joseph Karl (b. 1960); married to Princess Margarete von Hohenberg
(78) Archduke Joseph Albrecht (b. 1994)
(79) Archduke Paul Leo (b. 1996)
(80) Archduke Andreas-Augustinus (b. 1963); married to Countess Marie-Christine von Hatzfeldt-Dönhoff
(81) Archduke Friedrich-Cyprian (b. 1995)
(82) Archduke Pierre (b. 1997)
(83) Archduke Benedikt-Alexander (b. 2005)
(84) Archduke Nikolaus (b. 1973); married to Eugenia de Calonje y Gurrea
(85) Archduke Nicolás (b. 2003)
 (86) Archduke Santiago (b. 2006)
 (87) Archduke Johannes (b. 1975); married to María Gabriela Montenegro Villamizar
(88) Archduke Johannes (b. 2010)
(89) Archduke Alejandro (b. 2011)
 (90) Archduke Ignacio (b. 2013)
(91) Archduke Géza (b. 1940); married morganatically twice to (1) [divorced] Monika Decker and (2) [civilly] Elizabeth Jane Kunstadter. Issue by both marriages.
  (92) Archduke Michael (b. 1942); married to Princess Christiana of Löwenstein-Wertheim-Rosenberg, his brother's sister-in-law.
 (93) Archduke Eduard (b. 1967); married to Baroness Maria Theresia von Gudenus
 (94) Archduke Paul Benedikt (b. 2000)
 (95) Father Paul Habsburg (b. 1968), a  priest of the Legion of Christ

See also 
 House of Habsburg
 House of Lorraine

Notes

References

Sources 

 C. A. Macartney, The Habsburg Empire, 1790–1918, Faber & Faber, 2014, 900 pages. 
 Jean Bérenger, Histoire de l'empire des Habsbourg, 1273–1918, Fayard, 1990, 810 pages. 
 Hans Bankl, Mal d'Asburgo. Vizi, vezzi, malanni e manie della Casa Imperiale d'Austria , traduzione di Flavia Foradini, Trieste, mgs press, 1998, pp. 202
 Flavia Foradini, "Otto d'Asburgo. L'ultimo atto di una dinastia", mgs press, Trieste, 2004. 
 Martha e Horst Schad, La prediletta. Il diario della figlia di Sissi, traduzione di Flavia Foradini, Trieste, mgs Press 2001, 
 Sigrid-Maria Größing, Rodolfo d'Asburgo. Libero pensatore, rubacuori, psicopatico, traduzione di Flavia Foradini, Trieste, mgs Press 2006, 
 House of Habsburg (Wikipedia)
 House of Lorraine (Wikipedia)

External links

 
House of Habsburg
House of Lorraine
1736 establishments in Austria